The Relict Lime Grove is a linden grove in Ubinsky District of Novosibirsk Oblast, Russia. The grove has existed since preglacial times.

History 
The Relict Lime Grove was discovered in 1928 by A. M. Zharkova of the Russian Geographical Society.

Description
The grove is several million years old. It is located in the Senchinskoye Swamp northeast of Lake Ubinskoye.

External links
 Реликтовая липовая роща. Новосибирский краеведческий портал. Relict Lime Grove. Novosibirsk Local History Portal.
 Specially Protected Natural Territories of Russia.

Geography of Novosibirsk Oblast